Elections for a new set of provincial and local city and municipal officials were held in the Philippines on January 18, 1988 under the new Constitution of the Philippines which was ratified in 1987.

Background
Candidates from the PDP-Laban, KBL, PDP-Laban-Lakas ng Bansa, PDP, Biled Ti La Union, Nacionalista Party, Balane, PDP-Laban-Liberal Party, Magdalo, Cory Coalition, National Union of Christian Democrats, Independent Nacionalista ALLIEN, Laban, Pinaghiusa, CCA-Unido, Partido Demokrasya Sosyalista, Ompia Party, Timawa Party and Unido-LP-Laban, and independents contested in the elections.

Election Day
These elections were less fraudulent than the congressional elections, as the ruling party had limited capacity for wholesale fraud. The vigilance of the electorate, media, and the opposition safeguarded the exercise from manipulation. Elections in "hot spots" were postponed by COMELEC to prevent possible violent encounters between rivals. Most of the candidates endorsed by Cory Aquino won the support of the majority of the electorate.

See also
Commission on Elections
Politics of the Philippines
Philippine elections

External links
 Official website of the Commission on Elections

1988
1988 elections in the Philippines